Pterochelus triformis is a species of sea snail, a marine gastropod mollusc in the family Muricidae, the murex snails or rock snails.

Description
This sea snail is generally white shading to brown. The opening is shaped like an oval, with a complex series of channels extending throughout.

They are predatory, drilling holes into the shells of organisms such as clams and barnacles to feed.

References

Muricidae
Gastropods described in 1845